IUO may refer to:

Igbinedion University, Okada, the first private university in Nigeria
Università degli Studi di Napoli "L'Orientale", a university in Italy
Institut Universitaire de l'Ouest, from the list of universities in Haiti
Industrial Unit Output, the currency unit of the game, Stellar Conquest